Doug O'Dell is a retired Major general in the United States Marine Corps, notable for being appointed as the head of the Office of the Federal Coordinator for Gulf Coast Rebuilding by President Bush.

Early life
He grew up in Pottstown, PA and attended The Hill School and Rutgers University.
Upon graduation from Rutgers in 1968, he was commissioned through the Platoon Leaders Class.

During his career in the United States Marine Corps Reserves, he pursued a civilian career in investment management, and retired in 2001

References 

The Hill School alumni
Rutgers University alumni